Shadow Company is a documentary directed by Nick Bicanic and Jason Bourque and narrated by Gerard Butler. It is an introduction to the mercenary and private military company industry, concentrating on the role the industry has been playing in recent conflicts. It was released on DVD in August 2006.

Content 

The documentary film is not presented with a complete voice narrative nor a linear story-telling structure. Instead, most of the documentary deals with the issues presented in a topical fashion. There are three primary methods that the filmmakers use to organize and present information. The first is through the personal account of a security contractor named James Ashcroft, the second is to pose questions and directly answer them, and the third method is to utilize small case studies. The film contains footage of mercenary and private military soldiers training in Iraq. Director Nick Bicanic was invited to a Senate Committee Hearing to testify on the subject of mercenaries/private military companies on September 21, 2007.

Letters from James 

At certain intervals in the documentary, the audience is read different letter excerpts from a security contractor named James Ashcroft (voiced by Gerard Butler). The letter scenes explain the details of James's work and life in Iraq and a small amount of his personal history. Much of the comedy from the documentary is displayed in these scenes. In addition, the letters serve as an opener and a closer for the interview portions of the documentary.

One scene displays a quick montage of James’s life up to Iraq. The viewer finds out James Ashcroft was a graduate of the University of Oxford. Sometime after graduation, he joined the British military and performed bodyguard work in Milan and Paris later on. When the audience listens to his first letter, they find out that he quit his last job at a law firm before heading to Iraq.

His new line of work in Iraq involves being a security contractor for a reputable private military company. He says he is on a ‘six on three off rotation’, which means he works for six weeks, before getting three weeks of off time, and the letters are written in the six-week time frame. Also, he mentions working out of a villa in the Green Zone, the area where the Coalition Provisional Authority resides.

Ashcroft shares how his firm procures weapons like AK-47s and PKMs from the Sadr City bazaar, and how the US military or his firm deals with insurgents. James Ashcroft's autobiography, Making A Killing, written with the ghostwriter Clifford Thurlow was published by Virgin in the UK in 2006 and the US in 2007.

Part of the proceeds of the DVD sales go to the Cape Community Elementary School in Freetown, Sierra Leone.

Interviewees 
Listed in the press release are:

 P. W. Singer, senior analyst of the Brookings Institution
 Alan W. Bell, president of Globe Risk International
 Robert Young Pelton, author and adventurer
 Madelaine Drohan, author and journalist
 Ian Church, adventurer
 Phil Lancaster, Major (Ret.) of the Canadian Armed Forces (aide of Roméo Dallaire during UNAMIR)
 Slavko Ilic, security contractor
 Cobus Claassens, security contractor
 Neall Ellis, private military contractor
 Doug Brooks, IPOA president 
 Stephen J. Cannell, producer, creator of The A-Team
 Eike-Henner W. Kluge, professor of ethics
 Frances Stonor Saunders, author and historian
 John F. Mullins, Vietnam veteran turned mercenary, he became known for serving as the protagonist and military consultant for the popular video game series Soldier of Fortune.
 Tasha Bradsell, journalist

References

External links 
 
 
 "Who's Fighting Our Wars?", AlterNet News, January 9, 2006.
 "Anger deep in the heart of Texas", Toronto Star, March 17, 2006.
 "Shadow of the front line", Toronto Star, March 17, 2006.
 "Shadow Company" , Hollywood Reporter, June 22, 2006.
 "In the company of mercenaries", North Adams Transcript (MA), December 7, 2006.

2006 films
Mercenary warfare
English-language Canadian films
Iraq War
Documentary films about the Iraq War
Documentary films about the military–industrial complex
American documentary films
2006 documentary films
Canadian documentary films
2000s English-language films
Films directed by Jason Bourque
2000s American films
2000s Canadian films